Netta is a genus of diving ducks.

Netta may also refer to:

 Netta (name)
 Netta (river) in north-east Poland
 Netta (village), near Augustów in north-east Poland
 Netta, an introductory form of netball

See also

Neta (disambiguation)
Natta (disambiguation)
Nesta (disambiguation)
Netra (disambiguation)
Nette (disambiguation)
Netto (disambiguation)
Nitta (disambiguation)